is an airport in the city of Mihara, Hiroshima Prefecture, Japan.

History

The New Hiroshima Airport was opened for public use on 29 October 1993 as a replacement for the old Hiroshima Airport, which was renamed Hiroshima-Nishi Airport. The old airport was located in a more central waterfront location, but was too small to handle widebody aircraft and could not be expanded. In 1994, the New Hiroshima Airport was renamed to just Hiroshima Airport.

The airport's single runway opened with a length of 2,500 m (700 m longer than Hiroshima-Nishi). The runway was then extended to 3,000 m in 2001, and its ILS was upgraded to CAT-IIIa in 2008 and CAT-IIIb in 2009.

Terminal
The airport only has one terminal with separated departures and arrivals facilities for domestic and international flights and seven lettered gates (A through D domestic; E through G international). The international and domestic areas are separated landside by a central atrium. The domestic departures lounge has separate JAL and ANA airline lounges, while the international area has one shared airport lounge.

Airlines and destinations
80% of the airport's domestic traffic is to and from Haneda Airport in Tokyo. The Hiroshima-Haneda route is the fifth-busiest domestic air route in Japan.

The only international routes available at this airport are to other Asian countries such as Thailand, South Korea, Taiwan and China.

Statistics

Source:

Ground transportation

Road
The airport has no direct expressway connection but is located near the San'yō Expressway. Limousine bus service to and from the downtown Hiroshima Bus Terminal is scheduled at 53 minutes but is often subject to traffic delays. Hiroshima Station is accessible by bus in 45 minutes. Bus service is also available to Shiraichi Station, Fukuyama Station, Kure Station and Mihara Station.

Rail
Unusually among major Japanese airports, Hiroshima Airport has no railway station. The closest station is Shiraichi Station on the San'yō Main Line, and planners have proposed connecting the airport to this station with a new line, or to build a new station on the San'yō Shinkansen high-speed rail line. The West Japan Railway Company, which operates both lines, has rejected proposals for connections because of the high cost involved and to maintain JR's competitiveness with commercial airlines for passenger traffic to and from Hiroshima.

Accidents and incidents

On 14 April 2015, Asiana Airlines Flight 162, operated by Airbus A320 HL-7762 departed the runway on landing. The aircraft was operating an international scheduled passenger flight from Incheon International Airport, Seoul, South Korea. At least 27 of the 81 people on board were injured (25 passengers and two crew members). Initial indications were that the aircraft had hit off the localizer antenna belonging to the airport's Instrument landing system as it was coming in to land. The airport was closed through 16 April and reopened on 17 April with the ILS offline, resulting in flight cancellations during periods of adverse weather.

References

External links

 
 Japan Airlines Hiroshima Airport Guide
 
 

Airports in Japan
Transport in Hiroshima Prefecture
Buildings and structures in Hiroshima Prefecture
1993 establishments in Japan
Airports established in 1993